Frank Dressler-Lehnhof (born 30 September 1976) is a German former professional road cyclist.

Major results
2002
 2nd Romsée–Stavelot–Romsée
 4th Internationale Wielertrofee Jong Maar Moedig
2006
 6th Grand Prix Möbel Alvisse
2007
 2nd Internationale Wielertrofee Jong Maar Moedig
 4th Overall La Tropicale Amissa Bongo
 6th Grand Prix de la ville de Pérenchies
 9th Overall Tour de Korea
 10th Grand Prix de Beuvry-la-Forêt
2009
 3rd Grand Prix de la ville de Pérenchies
 4th Tartu Grand Prix
 8th Tallinn–Tartu Grand Prix
2010
 1st Ronde Pévéloise

References

External links

1976 births
Living people
German male cyclists
People from Landstuhl
Cyclists from Rhineland-Palatinate